Andreas Nyhaug (born 24 March 1973) is a retired Norwegian football defender.

He started his career in Råde IL and represented Norway as a youth international. He went from Moss FK to Viking FK in 1997, then Skeid Fotball in 1998 before moving to Telemark in 1999; first playing for IL Skarphedin.

Outside of football, Nyhaug became a lawyer.

References

1973 births
Living people
People from Råde
Norwegian footballers
Moss FK players
Viking FK players
Skeid Fotball players
Tollnes BK players
Pors Grenland players
Notodden FK players
Norwegian First Division players
Eliteserien players
Association football defenders
Norway youth international footballers
Norway under-21 international footballers
Sportspeople from Viken (county)